Eunostus is a genus of beetles in the family Carabidae, containing the following species:

 Eunostus allardi Basilewsky, 1957
 Eunostus burgeoni Alluaud, 1919
 Eunostus chappuisi Alluaud, 1936
 Eunostus crampeli Alluaud, 1919
 Eunostus guieinzii Chaudoir, 1862
 Eunostus guineensis Straneo, 1943
 Eunostus harrarensis Alluaud, 1919
 Eunostus insignis Alluaud, 1919
 Eunostus latreillei Laporte De Castelnau, 1835
 Eunostus milloti Jeannel, 1949
 Eunostus perrieri Jeannel, 1949
 Eunostus puncticeps Basilewsky, 1957
 Eunostus sicardi Jeannel, 1949
 Eunostus vuilleti Alluaud, 1919

References

Dryptinae